Coleophora berdjanski is a moth of the family Coleophoridae. It is found in Ukraine.

References

berdjanski
Moths described in 1991
Moths of Europe